The Lega–Binja languages are part of the Bantu languages coded Zone D.20 in Guthrie's classification, specifically D.24–26, which according to Nurse & Philippson (2003) form a valid clade. According to Ethnologue, Bembe, which Nurse & Philippson were not sure belonged in its traditional group of D.50, is the closest language to Lega-Mwenga; Glottolog has it closest to Songoora. The resulting languages are:

 Shabunda-Lega (incl. Kanu, Kwami), Mwenga-Lega, Bembe, Songoora (North Binja), Zimba (South Binja)

Footnotes

References